Alpha Motherfuckers – A Tribute to Turbonegro is a tribute album by various artists, originally released on 9 June 2001 (18 June 2001 in the US). It is compiled of covers of the Norwegian band Turbonegro.

The artists on this record range from major bands Queens of the Stone Age, HIM from Finland, and Therapy? from the UK, to US punk and hardcore bands such as The Dwarves and The Supersuckers, to lesser known Scandinavian artists. Modern Fix described it as "one of the strangest bands of the last ten years"

Multiple versions of this album exist, including the German version that included a bonus disc of left-over covers in the early first limited pressings; there is also a US version that includes one bonus track from the limited bonus disc that came with the first limited German pressings; and an Australian version that had a similar track listing to the later German pressings.

Track listings

Bitzcore limited first edition
The initial 2xCD and 2xLP versions of the album had track lists as follows:

Disc one
 Nashville Pussy – "The Age of Pamparius"
 Therapy? – "Denim Demon"
Amulet – "Hate the Kids"
 Supersuckers – "Get It On"
 Bela B. & Denim Girl – "Are You Ready for Some Darkness?"
 Queens of the Stone Age – "Back to Dungaree High"
 HIM – "Rendezvous with Anus"
 Satyricon – "I Got Erection"
 Maryslim – "No Beast So Fierce"
 Scot Free – "Rock Against Ass"
 Nullskattesnylterne – "Sailor Man"
 Hot Water Music – "Prince of the Rodeo"
 Griffin – "Bad Mongo"
 Zeke – "Midnight NAMBLA"
 Peepshows – "Just Flesh"
 Spacebitch – "Don't Say Motherfucker, Motherfucker"
 Motorpsycho – "He's a Grungewhore"
 ADZ – "Good Head"
 The Dwarves/Splittin Wix – "Hobbit Motherfuckers"
 Puffball – "Zonked Out on Hashish"
 Motosierra – "Hobbit Motherfuckers"
 Samesugas – "(I Fucked) Betty Page" (Galician lyrics)
 Ratos de Porão – "Suburban Anti-Christ"
 Real McKenzies – "Sailor Man"
 Toby Dammit – "Prince of the Rodeo"

Disc two
(Limited bonus CD only)

 Scot Free – "The Age of Pamparius"
 Moral Hazard – "I Got Erection!"
 Red Hot Lovers – "Black Chrome"
 The Gravy Boys – "Destination Hell"
 Scared of Chaka – "Selfdestructo Bust"
 Jerry Spider Gang – "Toodlepip Fuck"
 Three Years Down – "Selfdestructo Bust"
 Peter Pan – "Don't say Motherfucker, Motherfucker"
 Cellophane Suckers – "I'm in Love with the Destructive Girls" (German lyrics)
 Prollhead! – "Gut bläst (aka Good Head)" (German lyrics)

Other versions (Bitzcore later editions, Tilt edition, Hopeless edition) 
As per disc one above, except the "Hopeless" edition which added the following track as track 5.
 Scared of Chaka – "Selfdestructo Bust"

References

2001 compilation albums
Turbonegro tribute albums